Yevgeny Valeryevich Pomazan (born 31 January 1989) is a Russian footballer. He plays for SKA-Khabarovsk.

Career
Pomazan previously played for FC Kuban Krasnodar. He was part of the Russian Under 17 squad that won the 2006 UEFA European Under-17 Football Championship. In 2007, he represented Europe at the Meridian Cup, which the European team won 10–1 on aggregate over two games.

On the final day of the transfer window in the summer of 2007, Pomazan signed on loan with CSKA Moscow. He made his Russian Premier League debut for CSKA Moscow on 28 October 2007 in a 4–2 game against FC Krylia Sovetov Samara.

In the June 2013 Pomazan joined newly promoted Ural Sverdlovsk Oblast on a season-long loan.

On 2 July 2014 Pomazan joined Kuban Krasnodar on a season-long loan deal. He only played one game for Kuban in the Russian Cup.

Career honours
 Russian Cup: 2008, 2009

References

External links
CSKA Moscow profile

1989 births
People from Tashkent Region
Living people
Russian footballers
Russia youth international footballers
Russia under-21 international footballers
Russia national football B team footballers
Association football goalkeepers
FC Kuban Krasnodar players
PFC CSKA Moscow players
FC Ural Yekaterinburg players
PFC Spartak Nalchik players
FC Anzhi Makhachkala players
FC Baltika Kaliningrad players
FC Dinamo Minsk players
FC Chayka Peschanokopskoye players
FC SKA-Khabarovsk players
Russian Premier League players
Russian First League players
Russian Second League players
Belarusian Premier League players
Russian expatriate footballers
Expatriate footballers in Belarus
Russian expatriate sportspeople in Belarus